Jetsam Moraine is a thin, sinuous medial moraine that arcs smoothly for  from a point near Mount Razorback to beyond the far (northeastern) side of Black Pudding Peak, in the Prince Albert Mountains of Victoria Land, Antarctica. Its curved trajectory marks the contact between Benson Glacier ice and that of Midship Glacier. It was so named by a 1989–90 New Zealand Antarctic Research Programme field party from association with the Flotsam Moraines and because all supraglacial moraines are "floating" on the glacier ice, and drift similarly to flotsam and jetsam.

References

Moraines of the Ross Dependency
Landforms of Victoria Land
Scott Coast